Of Pure Blood is a 1986 made-for-TV thriller for CBS that premiered on October 19, 1986, directed by Joseph Sargent and starring Lee Remick.

Alicia Browning (Remick) is a casting director in New York City  whose grown son is shot to death in Munich, Germany by police when he apparently tried to attack a doctor who was attending the annual Oktoberfest. When Alicia travels to Germany—her native homeland—to investigate, she finds the old Nazi Lebensborn breeding programs still alive and wanting her son's child—her grandchild—that he fathered with a German girlfriend before his death, for their attempts to recreate Hitler's so-called 'master race' and a modern-day Fourth Reich.

Cast 
 Lee Remick as Alicia Browning
 Eszter Marai as young Alicia Browning
 Patrick McGoohan as Dr. Felix Neumann
 Gottfried John as Paul Bergmann
 Richard Münch as Dr. Bamberg
 Katharina Böhm as Ursula Schiller
 Carolyn Nelson Sargent as Johanna
 Catherine McGoohan as Pru
 Hans-Jürgen Schatz as Bank Manager
 Pascal Breuer as Eric
 Beate Finckh as Marta
 Shane Rimmer as The Colonel

External links

1986 films
1986 television films
American television films
Films set in West Germany
Films shot in Germany
Films directed by Joseph Sargent
1980s English-language films